New Mexico Lobos baseball is a college baseball program of the University of New Mexico in Albuquerque, New Mexico. The Lobos have won three conference tournaments, finished first in regular season conference play eight times, and appeared in the NCAA Division I Baseball Championship five times. The team plays their home games on the University of New Mexico campus at Santa Ana Star Field. Tod Brown has been the head coach of the Lobos since the 2022 season.

History
The first team was fielded in 1899 and has a 1,820–1,645–16 (.523) record through the 2022 season.
The 2022 season was the 105th season that the University of New Mexico has field a baseball team (the team did not play 19 seasons: 1902, 1903, 1909, 1918, 1924–1926, 1928, 1930–1938, 1944, and 1945).

In 1951, the Lobos began play in the Skyline Eight Conference, recording a first place regular season finish in the Eastern Division in 1953, 1958, and their final season in the conference in 1962. The 1962 season also saw the Lobos participate in the NCAA Division I Baseball Championship for the first time.

UNM was a charter member of the Western Athletic Conference (WAC) and begin conference play with Arizona, Arizona State, BYU, Utah, and Wyoming in 1963. Until leaving the WAC to become a charter member of the Mountain West Conference (MW) in 2000, the Lobos finished first in the regular season standings only once, 1985 in the Southern Division, and lost to BYU in a postseason playoff series.

As a member of the MW, the Lobos have finished first in the regular season in six seasons: 2000, 2011, 2012, 2013, 2014, and 2017. The Lobos returned to the NCAA Division I Baseball Championship in 2000, the second time in program history. The Lobos won the Mountain West Conference baseball tournament in 2011, 2012, and 2016.

The Lobos have had 27 different players earn All-America honors. Additionally, they have had 11 players be named Freshman All-America. In 2013 D. J. Peterson became the first player in program history to become a three-time All-American.

UNM has had 93 players selected in the MLB Draft in its history, including a pair of first-round picks: Kevin Andersh in 1985, and Peterson in 2013. Since Birmingham took over the team has had 24 players selected, including a school-record seven in 2013. 

New Mexico student-athletes have set numerous NCAA records including season batting average (Keith Hagman, 1980 - .551), most triples (Hagman, 1980 - 17), RBIs in an inning (Jonathan Gallegos, 8 - vs. Utah, March 13, 1993) and doubles by a freshman (Peterson, 32 - 2011). The team also has several records including hits by both teams (68 vs. Fresno State - April 1, 1999), triples in a game (7 vs. CSU-Pueblo - March 27, 1976) and plate appearances in an inning (25 vs. Utah - March 13, 1993).

Ballparks

Santa Ana Star Field
Santa Ana Star Field is the home of UNM baseball. After spending nine and a half seasons across the street at Isotopes Park, UNM returned to Santa Ana Star Field for good on March 24, 2013, as the Lobos hosted a doubleheader against the Nevada Wolf Pack.

"We need to have our own place to play," said head coach Ray Birmingham. "The kids deserve their own field to practice and play on, and now we have that. They've earned it."

Santa Ana Star Field received a major upgrade that started before the 2013 season. It received a FieldTurf playing surface, upgraded scoreboard, dugouts, bullpens, and bleachers as a part of the first phase of the Lobo Field renovation. Further renovations enhanced the concession areas, the fan plaza between Lobo Field and the softball field, the press box and the bleachers. Lights were installed in the fall of 2013, and a new clubhouse was dedicated December 28, 2016.

"We have lights because of (former Lobo) Dee Dennis and a bunch of guys who chipped in to help me and Dee do this," Birmingham said. "This is Lobo Field. This is (the state of) New Mexico’s baseball field, at least that’s how I feel about it. ... There will not only be Lobo games on here, but there will also be state championship games here. We hope to bring in some great big tournaments over the years to this city and let our kids experience the world. We think New Mexico kids can get the rest of the experiences that the rest of the country has, then they will grow faster and realize they’re as good as anybody.”

After nine years at Isotopes Park, the Lobos returned to Lobo Field in March 2013. From 2013-2022, the team has a 94-38-1 (.711) record at home.

On December 16th, 2015, UNM announced it had reached a 10-year, $1 million deal with Bernalillo company Tamaya Enterprises to rename the stadium Santa Ana Star Field. UNM used the money for further renovations to the field.

Isotopes Park

The Lobos played at Isotopes Park from 2003 until partway through the 2013 season when they returned to Lobo Field full-time.

People

Head coaches
The Lobos' head coach since the 2022 season has been Tod Brown. Ray Birmingham had a record of 467–413–4 (.531) in fifteen seasons at head coach. He took over for Rich Alday, who coached the Lobos for 18 season (1990–2007) and posted a record of 515-513-3 (.501). Prior to him Vince Cappelli was coach for 13 seasons from 1977-89, and he obtained a record of 384-350-6 (.523). Bob Leigh was the head coach from 1966-76, and in his 11 season he coached the Lobos to a record of 309-212-2 (.593). The first post-WWII head coach for UNM was George Petrol who was in charge of the program from 1947-65. In his 19 seasons the Lobos posted a record of 195-240-1 (.448).

Players

Former Lobo players include:
 David Carpenter
 Jim Fregosi
 Mitch Garver
Luis Fernando González Hoenig (born 1995), baseball outfielder for the San Francisco Giants
 Daniel Herrera
 Larry Jaster
 Mark Johnson
 Jim Kremmel
 Bobby LaFromboise
 Rod Nichols
 Jordan Pacheco
 D. J. Peterson
 Jimmy Serrano
 Scott Strickland
 Jamie Vermilyea
 Matt Young

Year-by-Year results

1899: 1-0
1900: 1-1
1901-02: No baseball
1903: 1-0
1904: 2-0
1905: 2-0
1906: 5-2
1907: 3-1
1908: 3-2
1909: No baseball
1910: 7-1
1911: 1-5
1912: 2-3
1913: 1-1
1914: 4-2*
1915: 0-1
1916: 5-1
1917: 4-3
1918: No baseball
1919: 4-5
1920: 2-0
1921: 2-0
1922: 1-0
1923: 1-1
1924-26: No baseball
1927: 1-0
1928: No baseball
1929: 0-1
1930-38: No baseball
1939: 0-2
1940: 7-4
1941: 8-3
1942: 4-6
1943: 0-1
1944-45: No baseball
1946: 4-5
1947: 6-7
1948: 9-11
1949: 14-7
1950: 4-13
1951: 4–14 (0-8 Skyline)
1952: 6–8 (5-7 Skyline)
1953: 13–5 (10-2 Skyline)
1954: 8–11 (6-6 Skyline)
1955: 7–9 (5-7 Skyline)
1956: 8–9 (6-6 Skyline)
1957: 10–13 (6-6 Skyline)
1958: 13–9 (7-5 Skyline)
1959: 9–15 (4-8 Skyline)
1960: 11–19 (8-4 Skyline)
1961: 13–12 (9-3 Skyline)
1962: 16–14 (9-3 Skyline)
1963: 18–16 (3-9 WAC)
1964: 8-29* (0-12 WAC)
1965: 18–19 (2-10 WAC)
1966: 23–17 (3-9 WAC)
1967: 24-19* (4-8 WAC)
1968: 37–13 (6-6 WAC)
1969: 30-17* (7-11 WAC)
1970: 27–18 (9-9 WAC)
1971: 29–26 (5-13 WAC)
1972: 29–14 (8-10 WAC)
1973: 28–17 (4-13 WAC)
1974: 28–23 (6-12 WAC)
1975: 26–24 (3-15 WAC)
1976: 28–24 (4-14 WAC)
1977: 32–20 (7-11 WAC)
1978: 31–24 (5-12 WAC)
1979: 37–23 (11-5 WAC)
1980: 41–22 (16-8 WAC)
1981: 24-30* (2-11 WAC)
1982: 33–29 (9-15 WAC)
1983: 25-41* (5-19 WAC)
1984: 31-26* (10-14 WAC)
1985: 42–17 (14-8 WAC)
1986: 26-21* (16-8 WAC)
1987: 29–29 (13-8 WAC)
1988: 23-31* (11-17 WAC)
1989: 10-37* (6-20 WAC)
1990: 25–31 (10-16 WAC)
1991: 25–33 (13-15 WAC)
1992: 34-25* (18-10 WAC)
1993: 35–21 (15-9 WAC)
1994: 32–24 (14-10 WAC)
1995: 29–26 (21-9 WAC)
1996: 27–24 (19-9 WAC)
1997: 25–32 (10-20 WAC)
1998: 27–31 (13-16 WAC)
1999: 29-30* (14-15 WAC)
2000: 35–21 (22-8 MW)
2001: 26–34 (14-16 MW)
2002: 22–35 (11-19 MW)
2003: 34–26 (17-13 MW)
2004: 26-29* (20-10 MW)
2005: 26–32 (15-15 MW)
2006: 30–29 (10-12 MW)
2007: 28–30 (12-12 MW)
2008: 34–25 (16-8 MW)
2009: 37–20 (15-8 MW)
2010: 38–22 (14-8 MW)
2011: 20–41 (10-14 MW)
2012: 37–24 (18-6 MW)
2013: 37–22 (25-5 MW)
2014: 37–20 (20-10 MW)
2015: 32–27 (17-13 MW)
2016: 39–23 (20-10 MW)
2017: 30-27* (19-9* MW)
2018: 20-33* (11-19 MW)
2019: 23-28* (11-16* MW)
2020: 14-4"
2021: 16–24 (10-16 MW)

∗ denotes tie
" - season shortened due to COVID-19 pandemic
bold - qualified for conference tournament
bold italic - qualified for NCAA tournament

References

External links
 Official website